Løke is a Norwegian surname. Notable people with the surname include:

Frank Løke (born 1980), Norwegian handball player
Heidi Løke (born 1982), Norwegian handball player, sister of Frank

Norwegian-language surnames